

{ "type": "ExternalData", "service": "page", "title": "Western Australian region - Great Southern.map" }
The Great Southern Region is one of the nine regions of Western Australia, as defined by the Regional Development Commissions Act 1993, for the purposes of economic development.  It is a section of the larger South coast of Western Australia and neighbouring agricultural regions.

The region officially comprises the local government areas of Albany, Broomehill-Tambellup, Cranbrook, Denmark, Gnowangerup, Jerramungup, Katanning, Kent, Kojonup, Plantagenet and Woodanilling.

Its administrative centre is the historic port of Albany. It has a Mediterranean climate, with hot, dry summers and cool, wet winters. The Stirling Range is the only place in Western Australia that regularly receives snowfalls, if only very light.

The economy of the Great Southern Region is dominated by livestock farming, dairy farming and crop-growing. It has some of the most productive cereal grain and pastoral land in the state, and is a major producer of wool and lamb. Albany is a major fishing centre.

The coast of the Great Southern Region has milder summer weather than areas on the west coast proper and is also a popular destination for holidaymakers, tourists, anglers and surfers. Albany is home to the Kalgan River which is associated with riverboats, from 1918 to 1935 with the Silver Star which lowered its funnel to get under a bridge, and today with the Kalgan Queen which lowers its roof to pass beneath the same bridge. 

Noongar people have inhabited the region for tens of thousands of years. European settlement began with the establishment of a temporary British military base, commanded by Major Edmund Lockyer, at King George Sound (Albany) on Christmas Day, 1826. Albany is consequently regarded as the oldest European settlement in Western Australia.

See also
 Great Southern Wine Region

References

Notes

Further reading

External links
 Great Southern Development Commission

 
Regions of Western Australia